Aitou (also Ayto, Aytou, Aytu, Aïtou, Aito, Itoo) is a village located in the Zgharta District in the North Governorate of Lebanon. Its population is Maronite Catholic.

Demographics

The current estimate is that 1157 people live in Aitou in about 200 houses. The people of Aitou are typically followers of the Maronite Catholic church. It is also estimated, according to some statistics, that in the U.S. there are about 14,000 immigrants from Aitou; most of whom live in Peoria, Illinois and have formed the Itoo Society. The Itoo Society was established in 1914 for several purposes: creating and maintaining unity among the Aitou community in Peoria, maintaining strong ties to the families remaining in Aitou and providing for the general welfare of both the Aitou community in Peoria and the citizens of the village of Aitou. There are also many immigrants from Aitou who live in Venezuela, Australia, Brazil, and some European countries.

Famous People from Aitou

The most renowned individuals from Aitou or descendants of Lebanese from Aitou are:
Ray LaHood, U.S. Secretary of Transportation
Monseigneur Michael Torbey.
Joseph Hitti, bishop
Bishop Hanna Alwan, Father Khalil Alwan, Superior General of the Lebanese Missionaries, Sister Vincent Alwan Superior General of Saint Vincent de Paul order.
Tonnous Fouad Gerges "Tony Sleiman" businessman and owner for Reporte newspaper and a Venezuelan bank. 
Sharp brain. 
President of federation of municipalities of Zgharta Caza and President of the municipality of Aitou.
Pierre Camille Torbey, businessman and owner for three international companies, headquarter based in Cameroon Africa.

Etymology
With a Qaf (Qaitou), the name in Aramaic could mean summer, heat or boar. It is equivalent to the Arabic Qaiz, meaning canicule or heat wave. It could refer to Aitou being used as a Summer Resort given the town's location at a high elevation, yet only 27 km from the Mediterranean coast.

With a Ghayn (Ghaithou), it could mean anger, rage.

With an Aleph ('Aitou), it could mean thick, obscure, magic in reference maybe to the thick forests or the thick fog that characterizes the summer evenings in this area.

Geography

Aitou is a mountainous village, located 113 km from Beirut and 27 km from Tripoli, Lebanon. The town occupies the northern slopes of Mount Lebanon at an elevation ranging between 900 and 1300 meters above sea level.

History

Antiquity
In antiquity, Aitou was famous for its oak and cedar forests. An Ancient Egyptian hieroglyphic inscription sent by Pharaoh Pepi II to one of the kings of Byblos, asking for a number of trees from the woods of the God Aitou in order to extract the resin used by the Egyptians for embalmment is indicative of the importance of the forests of Aitou in ancient times. The hieroglyphic inscription is found today at the National Museum of Beirut.

Ottoman period
After the settlement of the Maronites in Mount Lebanon in the 5th Century, there was a Muqaddam in Aitou counted among the Maronite leaders. The rule of the Aitou Muqaddam seems to have been limited to the nearby region till 1519.

In 1517, one year after the beginning of the Ottoman rule in Lebanon, the Muqaddam of Bsharri, Elias, died leaving the rule of the region to his young son Hanna, known later as Abdel Muneem. In 1519, the Muqaddam of Aitou, Kamal Eddine Ibn Abdel Al-Wahhab, known as Ibn Ajramah, profiting from the confusion and the young age of the Muqaddam of Bsharri, seized the power in Jebbet Bsharri. He was married to Sitt El Moulouk, a cousin of the Muqaddam of Bsharri. Sitt Al Moulouk played an important role in the take-over out of revenge because the family branch of her father, the Sheikh Alwan, was evicted from power in Jebbet Bsharri previously.

In the first Ottoman census of Jebbet Bsharri done in that same year, Aitou was credited with 28 male adults, 24 of them married.

The Muqaddam of Aitou, Ibn Ajramah, ruled Jebbet Bsharri for 18 years. He built a castle in Aitou and accumulated copious amounts of wealth.

In 1532, Abdel Muneem of Bsharri succeeded in getting back the rule on half of the region from Bsharri to Hadath El Jebbeh, the other half from Blaouza to Aitou staying under the rule of Ibn Ajramah of Aitou. In 1537, Abdul Muneem of Bsharri killed Ibn Ajramah of Aitou by stabbing him with his spear. The killing took place in the village of Blaouza. Ibn Ajramah was buried in Aitou behind the church of Mar Sarkis. This episode marked the end of the Muqaddams of Aitou.

But the wife of Ibn Ajramah, the above-mentioned Sitt El Moulouk, took eventually her revenge by paying mercenaries to assassinate Abdul Muneem in 1547, ending also this dynasty of Bsharri's Muqaddams as no male descendant was alive.

In the second Ottoman census of 1571, Aitou had 46 male adults, 40 of them being married.

Religious Structures

Churches
Church of Our Lady of Aitou
Church of Saint Rafqa
Church of Saint Domitius
Church of Saint Joseph
Church of Saint Sergius and Saint Bacchus Saint Sarkis & Bakhos
Church of Saint Simon

Monasteries

Monastery of Saint Simon
Monastery of Saint Artemios of Antioch (Challita)

References

External links
Aytou, Localiban 
 Ehden Family Tree 

Zgharta District
Populated places in the North Governorate
Maronite Christian communities in Lebanon